The 2013 NCAA Bowling Championship was the 10th annual tournament to determine the national champion of women's NCAA collegiate ten-pin bowling. The tournament was played at Freeway Lanes in Canton, Michigan from April 11–13, 2013.

Nebraska defeated Vanderbilt in the championship match, 4½ games to 2½ (211–199, 186–197, 156–169, 190–190, 196–189, 202–182, 246–200), to win their fourth national title. The Cornhuskers were coached by Bill Straub.

Nebraska's Liz Kuhlkin was named the tournament's Most Outstanding Player. Kuhlkin, along with four other bowlers, also comprised the All Tournament Team.

Qualification
Since there is only one national collegiate championship for women's bowling, all NCAA bowling programs (whether from Division I, Division II, or Division III) were eligible. A total of 8 teams were given at-large bids for this championship, which consisted of a modified double-elimination style tournament.

Tournament bracket 
Site: Super Bowl Lanes, Canton, Michigan
Host: Detroit Titans

Championship Match

All-tournament team
Liz Kuhlkin, Nebraska (Most Outstanding Player)
Elise Bolton, Nebraska
Jessica Earnest, Vanderbilt
Amanda Labossiere, Arkansas State
Kristie Lopez, UMES

References

NCAA Bowling Championship
Detroit Mercy Titans
2013 in American sports
2013 in bowling
2013 in sports in Michigan
April 2013 sports events in the United States